Vercorin is a village in the Swiss Alps, located in the canton of Valais. It belongs to the municipality of Chalais.

In winter Vercorin is a ski resort and includes  of prepared slopes on the Crêt du Midi.

Transportation
In addition to daily bus service from Sion and Sierre, there is an aerial tramway (gondola lift) connecting the mountain village of Vercorin with Chalais which runs precisely every 15 minutes.

References

Swisstopo topographic maps

External links

Official website

Villages in Valais
Ski areas and resorts in Switzerland